Northampton Town Council is the parish council covering the majority of the town of Northampton, England. The council is the largest parish level authority in England by population served. The council has its headquarters at Northampton Guildhall.

History
The council was created on 1 April 2020, but did not become fully functional until a year later. It was created to eliminate the need for charter trustees and to ensure Northampton had a representative body, following the abolition of the former Northampton Borough Council, which was merged into the larger unitary authority West Northamptonshire Council, following local government changes in Northamptonshire. Unlike the former borough council, the town council does not cover the entire Northampton urban area, as several smaller parish councils cover several of the town's suburbs. The town council covers an area with around 130,000 people, out of the roughly 225,000 people in Northampton as a whole.

The historic coat of arms from the former borough council were transferred to the new town council.

Responsibilities
The council initially took responsibility for cemeteries, allotments and the mayoralty, and also the running of civic events like festivals, Remembrance Sunday and Armed Forces Day. In 2021 it launched two schemes for distributing grants to local community groups and charities, from an annual budget of £125,000. In 2022 it launched an additional grant scheme with a budget of £50,000, for environmental projects to help address climate change.

Political control
At the first elections to the council on 7 May 2021, the Labour Party took control, winning 17 seats. The Conservative Party won seven, and the Liberal Democrats won one seat.

Other parishes in Northampton
As well as the Northampton Town Council area, there are 12 other civil parishes in the Northampton urban area, ten were pre-existing, and two (Kingsthorpe and Far Cotton and Delapre) were created concurrently with the town council, these are:
Billing
Duston
Collingtree
East Hunsbury
Far Cotton and Delapre
Great Houghton
Hardingstone
Hunsbury Meadows
Kingsthorpe
Upton
West Hunsbury
Wootton, Wootton Fields and Simpson Manor

References

External links
Official Website

Politics of Northampton
Local government in Northamptonshire
Parish councils of England
2020 establishments in England
Local authorities in Northamptonshire